NASCAR Heat 4 is a racing video game simulating the 2019 NASCAR season. It was developed by Monster Games and was published by 704Games on September 13, 2019 for PlayStation 4, Xbox One and Microsoft Windows via Steam. Kevin Harvick is the cover athlete (for the first time since NASCAR 2005: Chase for the Cup) for the regular release of the game along with Tony Stewart, and Jeff Gordon is on the cover of the Gold Edition.

Gameplay
The Xtreme Dirt Tour returned to the game, and Tony Stewart is a driver and team owner in the series. Players in career mode for the first time can start in any of the four series (NASCAR Cup, Xfinity, Trucks, and Xtreme Dirt). Additional updates to the game included different tire compounds for different track types and a track map. Also, custom cars now have an open number choice from 0-99 (including 00-09) for both quick race and career mode.

Downloadable content
Paid downloadable content packages are available. The downloadable content for pre-ordering is the ability to race Martinsville Speedway at night. 

Although later on in 2019, the  Martinsville night race would be a playable option in the game so some gamers didn’t have to download it.

Soundtrack

Reception

NASCAR Heat 4 received "mixed or average" reviews according to review aggregator Metacritic.

Matthew Kato of Game Informer called this iteration of NASCAR Heat the strongest, noting that its flaws made it more admirable than excellent. The online mode and AI were also criticized for being subpar and the career mode was deemed adequate.

Accolades
The game was nominated for "Game, Franchise Racing" at the NAVGTR Awards.

References

External links
 

2019 video games
NASCAR video games
PlayStation 4 games
Xbox One games
Windows games
Multiplayer and single-player video games
Racing video games
Split-screen multiplayer games
Video games developed in the United States
Video games set in the United States
Video games set in Canada
Monster Games games